Coptops lichenea is a species of beetle in the family Cerambycidae. It was described by Francis Polkinghorne Pascoe in 1865. It is known from Myanmar, Laos, Malaysia, and Nepal.

References

lichenea
Beetles described in 1865